"Disco Band" is a song by the Italian Italo disco band Scotch, released in 1984 as the lead single of their debut studio album Evolution. It was written by Fabio Margutti.

Background 

"Disco Band" was written by Fabio Margutti.

Track listing 

 Italian 7-inch single

A. "Disco Band" – 4:00
B. "Disco Band (Instrumental)" – 4:00

 Italian 12-inch single

A. "Disco Band" – 5:07
B. "Disco Band (Instrumental)" – 5:19

 German 12-inch maxi-single

A. "Disco Band" – 5:07
B. "Disco Band (Instrumental)" – 5:20

Personnel 

Scotch

 Vince Lancini – vocals
 Fabio Margutti – keyboards

Charts

References

External links 

 

1984 songs
1984 singles
Scotch (band) songs
ZYX Music singles
Songs about disco
Number-one singles in Austria